A selenite fluoride is a chemical compound or salt that contains fluoride and selenite anions ( and ). These are mixed anion compounds. Some have third anions, including nitrate, molybdate, oxalate, selenate, silicate and tellurate.

Naming 
A selenite fluoride compound may also be called a fluoride oxoselenate(IV) using IUPAC naming for inorganic compounds.

Production 
Rare earth selenite fluorides can be produced by dissolving the rare earth selenate into molten lithium fluoride at over 800°C, whereupon the selenate loses oxygen to become selenite, and crystals of the selenite fluoride can form. Another similar method involves heating the rare earth oxide, with a rare earth fluoride and selenium dioxide with a caesium bromide flux. If glass or silica containers are used, they are eaten away by the molten flux and silicates are formed some of which may be fluoride selenite silicate compounds.

Related 
Related to these are the selenite chlorides and selenite bromides by varying the halogenide. Similar compounds by varying the chalcogen also include the sulfite fluorides and tellurite fluorides.

List 

SHG=second harmonic generator

References 

Selenites
Fluorides
Mixed anion compounds